Fed is the second studio album by American musician Liam Hayes, released under his stage name Plush on December 23, 2002 on the record label After Hours exclusively in Japan. The album was belatedly released in Europe by Broken Horse Records on August 25, 2008, receiving highly positive reviews from music critics.

Recording
An early version of the Fed song "No Education" was released as a single in 1997. Formal recording sessions for Fed were started in early 2000, with engineers Bob Weston and Steve Albini and Konrad Strauss contributing to the recording. Weston stated:

Shortly after the sessions with Bob Weston, the album's recording was moved to Electrical Audio, with Steve Albini and Konrad Strauss taking over engineering and recording duties. Arranger Tom Tom MMLXXXIV, who had worked with Earth, Wind & Fire, Loleatta Holloway, and Minnie Riperton among others, was brought in to provide full band arrangements. An incredible amount of time was put into the recording and arrangement of the music being developed. The end result was an album full of ornamented arrangements with full horn sections married to rock band arrangements.

Critical reception

Upon being re-released in 2008, Fed was well-received by music critics. The album holds a score of 89 out of 100 on the review aggregator website Metacritic, indicating "universal acclaim".

Track listing
All songs written by Liam Hayes.
 "Whose Blues" – 5:04
 "I've Changed My Number" – 3:33
 "Blown Away" – 3:03
 "So Blind" – 3:20
 "Greyhound Bus Station" – 2:49
 "No Education" – 5:22
 "Sound of S.F." – 3:33
 "Born Together" – 2:53
 "Unis" – 0:26
 "Whose Blues Anyway" – 1:35
 "What'll We Do" – 3:03
 "Having It All" – 4:03
 "Fed Intro" – 6:50
 "Fed" – 6:50
 "The Woods" – 2:56

References

2002 albums
Liam Hayes albums